Raynald Blais (born January 5, 1954 in Port-Daniel, Quebec) is a Canadian politician. He represented the district Gaspésie—Îles-de-la-Madeleine in the House of Commons of Canada from 2004 to 2011 as a member of the Bloc Québécois.

He was first elected in 2004, but ran in the 2000 Canadian federal election in the riding of Bonaventure—Gaspé—Îles-de-la-Madeleine—Pabok and lost to Georges Farrah of the Liberal Party of Canada. Blais had 15,532 votes. Blais is a former journalist and political assistant.

External links
 
 How'd They Vote?: Raynald Blais' voting history and quotes

1954 births
Bloc Québécois MPs
French Quebecers
Living people
Members of the House of Commons of Canada from Quebec
People from Gaspésie–Îles-de-la-Madeleine
21st-century Canadian politicians